Jeansagnière is a former commune in the Loire department in central France. On 1 January 2016, it was merged into the new commune Chalmazel-Jeansagnière.

Geography
The river Lignon du Forez formed all of the commune's southern border.

See also
Communes of the Loire department

References

Former communes of Loire (department)